Into Another is an American rock band formed in 1990 in New York City.  The original lineup consisted of vocalist Richie Birkenhead (formerly of Underdog and Youth of Today), drummer Drew Thomas (formerly of Bold), bassist Tony Bono (formerly of Whiplash) and guitarist Peter Moses.  Into Another performed their first show at New York's Pyramid Club, supporting White Zombie. Their song "T.A.I.L." hit No. 39 on the U.S. Billboard Mainstream Rock Tracks chart in 1996. The band broke up later that year due to intra-band tensions and a deteriorated relationship with Hollywood Records.  Bassist Tony Bono died in May 2002.

In 2012, Into Another reunited for the Revelation Records 25th Anniversary shows at The Glasshouse in Pomona, California.  Original members Richie Birkenhead, Peter Moses and Drew Thomas were joined by guitarist Brian Balchack (Ignite) and bassist Reid Black (Innaway).

Discography

Albums 
 Into Another (1991, Revelation Records)
 Ignaurus (1994, Revelation Records)
 Seemless (1995, Hollywood Records)
 Soul Control (Unreleased, Hollywood Records)

Other 
 Creepy Eepy EP (1992, Revelation Records)
 "Poison Fingers" single (1995, Revelation Records)
 "T.A.I.L." single (1996, Hollywood Records)
 Omens EP (2015, Ghost Ship Records)

References

External links 
 

Alternative rock groups from New York (state)
American post-hardcore musical groups
Musical groups established in 1990
Musical groups disestablished in 1996
Revelation Records artists